is a Japanese actress. She is represented by Box Corporation.

Personal life
Aibu was born in Hyōgo prefecture. On May 3, 2016, she announced her marriage through her office.

Filmography

Drama
Water Boys (Fuji TV, 2003) as Atsumi Hayakawa
Lion Sensei (YTV, 2003) as Aya Onohara
Itoshi Kimi e (Fuji TV, 2004) as Banri Agawa
Gekidan Engimono Automatic (Fuji TV, 2004) as Sakurai
Ganbatte Ikimasshoi (KTV, 2005) as Rie Yano
Donmai (NHK, 2005) as Yū Satomi
Happy! (TBS, 2006) as Miyuki Umino
Attention Please (Fuji TV, 2006) as Yayoi Wakamura
Regatta (TV Asahi, 2006) as Misao Odagiri
Happy! 2 (TBS, 2006) as Miyuki Umino
Karei-naru Ichizoku (TBS, 2007) as Tsugiko Manpyō
Attention Please Special: Hawaii Honolulu-hen (Fuji TV, 2007) as Yayoi Wakamura
Ushi ni Negai o: Love & Farm (KTV, 2007) as Ayaka Fujii
Utahime (TBS, 2007) as Suzu Kishida/Ruriko Matsunaka
Zettai Kareshi (Absolute Boyfriend) (Fuji TV, 2008) as Izawa Riiko
Attention Please Special: Australia Sydney-hen (Fuji TV, 2008) as Yayoi Wakamura
Triangle (KTV, 2009) as Yui Gōda
Tenchijin (NHK, 2009) as Hanahime
Yonimo Kimyōna Monogatari Haru no Tokubetsu-hen (Fuji TV, 2009) as Ayaka Kida
Buzzer Beat (Fuji TV, 2009) as Natsuki Nanami
Seichō Matsumoto Drama Special Kiri no Hata (NTV, 2010) as Kiriko Yanagida
Wagaya no Rekishi (Fuji TV, 2010) as Misora Hibari
Perfect Report (Fuji TV, 2010) as Midori Okusawa
Ashita mo Mata Ikite Ikou (TBS, 2010) as Saori Kimura
Kokuhatsu: Kokusen Bengonin (TV Asahi, 2011) as Tsuruko Sawara
Rebound (NTV, 2011) as Nobuko Oba
Kaseifu no Mita (NTV, 2011) as Urara Yuuki
Rich Man, Poor Woman (Fuji TV, 2012) as Yōko Asahina
Rich Man, Poor Woman in New York (Fuji TV, 2013) as Yōko Asahina
Otomesan (TV Asahi, 2013) as Ririka Mizusawa
Miss Pilot (Fuji TV, 2013) as Chisato Oda
Massan (NHK, 2014) as Yūko Tanaka
Garasu no Ashi (WOWOW, 2015) as Setsuko Kōda
Ishitachi no Renai Jijō (Fuji TV, 2015) as Nana Kawai
Angel Heart (NTV, 2015) as Kaori Makimura
Karikare (NHK BS Premium, 2015)
Tamiō Spinoff: Koi Suru Sōsaisen (TV Asahi, 2016) as Shion Yukino
 Boku no Yabai Tsuma (KTV, 2016) as Anna Kitasato
 Kyoaku wa Nemurasenai (TV Tokyo, 2016) as Haruka Hattanda

Movies
 The Taste of Tea (2004) as Hotal
Mail de Todoita Monogatari (2005) as Risa Tanimura
Beat Kids (2005) as Nanao
Short Cakes (2005) as Nana
Professor Layton And The Eternal Diva (2009) as (Remi/Emmy Altava)
 Golden Slumbers (2010) as Koume Inohara
 Neck (2010) as Sugina Mayama
 Koi Suru Neapolitan: Sekai de Ichiban Oishī Aisarekata (2010) as Ruri Satō
 Hankyū Densha (2011) as Mayumi
 Fly: Heibon na Kiseki (2012) as Nanami Takasaki
  The Liar and His Lover (2013) as Mari
 A Loving Husband (2017) as Sumire Kadokura

Video Games
Professor Layton series - (Remi/Emmy Altava)

DubbingAbraham Lincoln: Vampire Hunter, Mary Todd Lincoln (Mary Elizabeth Winstead)

Photobooks
 Water Piece (2004, Wani Books) 
 10-dai: Aibu Love Live File (2005, Shueisha) 
 Surf Trip'' (2007, Shueisha)

References

External links
  

1985 births
Living people
People from Takarazuka, Hyōgo
Japanese television actresses
Japanese film actresses
Japanese television personalities
Actors from Hyōgo Prefecture
21st-century Japanese actresses